52nd Street is a street in Manhattan, New York City, United States.

52nd Street may also refer to:

 52nd Street (album), an album by Billy Joel
 52nd Street (band), an English jazz-funk band
 52nd Street (film), a 1937 film starring Ian Hunter

Railway stations
 52nd Street (IRT Flushing Line), a station on the New York City Subway
 52nd Street station (Market–Frankford Line), a SEPTA station on the Market–Frankford Line in Philadelphia
 52nd Street station (SEPTA Regional Rail), a regional rail station in Philadelphia which closed in 1980
 52nd Street (BMT Fifth Avenue Line), a demolished station in Brooklyn